The following is a list of episodes from the series Esme & Roy. In May 2019, a second season was announced. Later in December 2020, a holiday episode was released.

Series overview

Episodes

Season 1 (2018–19)

Season 2 (2020–21)

References

Lists of American children's animated television series episodes
Lists of Canadian children's animated television series episodes